José Manuel Angel (born 24 August 1948) is a Salvadoran former footballer. He competed in the men's tournament at the 1968 Summer Olympics.

References

External links
 

1948 births
Living people
Salvadoran footballers
El Salvador international footballers
Olympic footballers of El Salvador
Footballers at the 1968 Summer Olympics
People from Ilobasco
Association football midfielders
Alianza F.C. footballers